Lygrommatoides is a monotypic genus of Japanese long-spinneret ground spiders containing the single species, Lygrommatoides problematica. It was first described by Embrik Strand in 1918, and is only found in Japan.

See also
 List of Prodidominae species

References

Prodidominae
Monotypic Araneomorphae genera
Spiders of Asia
Taxa named by Embrik Strand